Temora stylifera is a copepod primarily found in the Atlantic and surrounding waters.

Description

Distribution
T. stylifera is primarily found in the Atlantic, off of the coasts of Central America, northern South America, western Europe, and northern Africa. It can also be found in large numbers in the Mediterranean Sea and Red Sea.

Ecology

Life cycle and reproduction
Although T. stylifera is a continuous breeder, it experiences seasonal fluctuations in egg production rate. During one study in the Gulf of Naples, maximum egg production rates were found to occur from about February to July, with minimum rates found between about August and mid-October. In an earlier study, however, maximum egg production was found in late summer, with a period of minimal reproduction occurring in winter. Females can only go about three or four days before needing to remate to continue to produce fertile eggs. The eggs hatch about 88% of the time, with a decrease in success from September to October, and stage I nauplii survive to stage II about 12% of the time. All stages of T. stylifera (from stage I nauplii to adults) are most abundant in the Gulf of Naples from August to October. During this time, stage I through III nauplii are mainly concentrated in the top  of depth (although they range to ), and the older nauplii are mainly concentrated in the  closest to the surface (but they can be found deeper than this). Copepodite stages I through IV are generally more abundant than stage V copepodites. Stage I through III copepodites are usually found in the top  of the water column, with the distribution of older stages being variable. At some stations, older copepodites are generally found in the top , whereas at some stations, the distributions may be deeper in the season of highest abundance.

References

Temoridae
Crustaceans of the Atlantic Ocean
Fauna of the Mediterranean Sea
Fauna of the Red Sea
Crustaceans described in 1849
Taxa named by James Dwight Dana